

Champions
National Association: Boston Base Ball Club

National Association final standings

Statistical leaders

Notable seasons
Boston Red Stockings pitcher Al Spalding has a record of 52-16, leading the NA with 52 wins and 617.1 innings pitched. He has a 1.92 earned run average and a 111 ERA+.
Chicago White Stockings second baseman Levi Meyerle leads the NA with a .394 batting average, a .889 OPS, and a 183 OPS+. He has 65 runs scored and 45 runs batted in.

Events

January–March
January 29 – Albert Spalding arrives in England to set up a tour for the Boston and Athletic Clubs to demonstrate American baseball to the English.

April–June
May 5 – Tommy Bond makes his professional debut, throwing a 4-hitter and defeating Lord Baltimore.
May 6 – Dick McBride of Athletic throws a 1-hitter in a win against crosstown rival Philadelphia.
May 13 – The Chicago Club plays the first professional game in Chicago by a Chicago team since the Great Chicago Fire of 1871.  The "White Stockings" win 4-0 over Athletic before 4,000 fans.
June 18 – Playing without suspended pitcher George Zettlein, the Chicagos are humiliated by Mutual 38-1.  The Mutuals collect 33 hits, but are outdone by Chicago defensive miscues as they commit 36 errors in the game.

July–September
July 10 – Jimmy Wood, player-manager for several teams in the NA, has his right leg amputated above the knee due to infection.  Wood would be re-hired by Chicago to replace Fergy Malone and be on the bench managing 5 weeks after the amputation.
July 16 – The Boston and Athletic Clubs depart from Philadelphia for England for their baseball exhibition tour.
September 9 – John Radcliff is dismissed from the Philadelphia Club after umpire William McLean testified that Radcliff had offered him $175 to fix a game.
September 9 – Boston and Athletic return from their England trip, arriving in New York.

October–December
October 20 – The Boston Base Ball Club win their 3rd consecutive pennant with a 14-7 victory over Athletic of Philadelphia.

Births
January 14 – Jack Taylor
January 22 – Jay Hughes
February 1 – Harry Bemis
February 22 – Bill Klem
February 23 – Billy Lauder 
February 24 – Honus Wagner
March 12 – Charles Weeghman
March 16 – Bill Duggleby
March 18 – Nixey Callahan
March 24 – Roy Thomas
April 7 – John Ganzel
April 8 – Bert Myers
May 8 – Eddie Boyle
June 5 – Jack Chesbro
June 5 – Frank Huelsman
June 20 – Win Mercer
June 26 – Topsy Hartsel
July 8 – Jay Parker
July 9 – Jack Powell
July 13 – William G. Bramham
July 14 – Jesse Tannehill
September 5 – Nap Lajoie
September 17 – Willie Sudhoff
September 21 – Grant "Home Run" Johnson
October 12 – Jimmy Burke
October 15 – Emil Frisk
October 19 – Tom McCreery
October 31 – Harry Smith

Deaths
April 9 – Charlie Mills, age unknown, catcher for the 1871 New York Mutuals.

References

External links
1874 season at Baseball-Reference.com
Charlton's Baseball Chronology at BaseballLibrary.com
Retrosheet.org